Albert Edward Clough (1901 – 1 January 1957) was an English professional footballer. A left back, he played one game each in the Football League for Blackburn Rovers and Blackpool.

References

1901 births
1957 deaths
English footballers
Great Harwood F.C. players
Blackburn Rovers F.C. players
Blackpool F.C. players
Date of birth missing
Association football fullbacks